Frohwerk v. United States, 249 U.S. 204 (1919), was a United States Supreme Court case in which the Court upheld the conviction of a newspaperman for violating the Espionage Act of 1917 in connection with criticism of U.S. involvement in foreign wars.

In a unanimous decision written by Justice Oliver Wendell Holmes, the Court found that this criticism constituted the "willful obstruction" of America's recruitment efforts and was not protected by the First Amendment to the United States Constitution. 

As in Schenck v. United States, also decided in 1919, the speech might have been protected were the country not at war.

External links

1919 in United States case law
United States First Amendment case law
United States Supreme Court cases
United States Supreme Court cases of the White Court
United States home front during World War I